National History Day is a non-profit organization in College Park, Maryland that operates an annual project-based contest for students in grades 6-12. It has affiliates in all fifty states, Washington, D.C., Puerto Rico, Guam, American Samoa, South Korea, China, South Asia, and Central America. It started as a local program in Cleveland, Ohio, headed by Dr. David Van Tassel, a history professor at Case Western Reserve University. It grew from 129 students in 1974 to over 500,000 students in 48 states in 1991, and 700,000 students and 40,000 teachers in 2001. Today more than half a million students enter through local contests. They construct entries as an individual or a group in one of five categories: Documentary, Exhibit, Paper, Performance, or Website. Students then compete in a series of regional contests with top entries advancing to state/affiliate contests. The top two entries in each category and division are invited to compete at the National Contest.

History
National History Day started in Cleveland, Ohio in 1974. Members of the History Department at Case Western Reserve University developed the initial idea for a history contest akin to Science Fair. In 1978, they incorporated the project and hired Lois Scharf as executive director. She worked to raise grant funds and recruit state historical organizations to join the program. She served until 1992.  Students gathered on campus to devote one day to history calling it "National History Day." Over the next few years, the contest expanded throughout Ohio and into surrounding Midwestern states. By 1980, with the help of the National Endowment for the Humanities, National History Day had grown into a national non-profit organization. In 1992 National History Day moved its headquarters from Cleveland to the Washington, D.C., area. National History Day now runs multiple educational programs but the National Contest is still the largest of these. The national finals take place each June during a week-long event held at the University of Maryland, College Park.

Annual theme

The annual theme frames students’ research within a historical theme. It is chosen for its broad application to world, national, or state history and its relevance to ancient history or the recent past. Themes are rotated each year and prior themes can be used after approximately twelve years.

Competition

Submissions
Students, either individually or as a group, can submit a project from one of the following categories: paper, exhibit, performance, documentary, or website. After reviewing the year's theme, the submission handbook, and choosing a topic, the student(s) should gather primary and secondary sources about their research. All sources need to be clearly cited in the annotated bibliography that is required for all projects. Additionally, a title page and a process paper must be submitted with each project. The process paper should include how the project's topic was chosen, how the research was conducted, how the actual project was created, the historical significance of the research, and the historical argument made in the project.

Judging
National History Day projects are judged using an evaluation form with two categories: Historical Quality (accounting for 80% of the score) and Clarity of Presentation (20% of the score). The Historical Quality category includes judging based on strengths of your historical argument, research, quality of primary sources, historical accuracy, multiple perspectives, and relevant connections to the historical context.

State and regional competitions
In some regions, students who reach enough points in their judging advance to state competitions, and any number of students at regional competitions can advance to states. In other states, such as California, Connecticut, and Pennsylvania, the top three projects at the regional competition advance to the state competition. Regions can be divided by geographic area, population, or by county.

At the state/affiliate level contests, students compete for a variety of prizes. The top two entries in each category and division are invited to the National Contest, held each June at the University of Maryland, College Park.

National competition

Preliminaries
In the preliminary rounds, each entry presents its project before a panel of three judges. In the case of the paper and website categories, the projects are reviewed by the judges before the presentations, while performances, documentaries, and exhibits are seen by the judges for the first time at the presentation. The top 2 entries in the senior, and junior division advance to the national contest. Judges in each room advance one entry to the final round of judging. Each room reviews approximately 9-10 entries.

Finals
Competitors that have advanced to the final round have their projects judged by a panel of three new judges, but the students are not interviewed in this round. Their project then has to stand alone for the final judging.

 
The awards for first, second, and third place at the national level are $1000, $500, and $250, respectively. "Outstanding Entry" awards are also given to two projects from each state: one junior entry and one senior entry. There are also more than a dozen special prizes awarded worth between $250 and $10,000.

Impact on students 
An independent study conducted in 2011 demonstrated that students who participate in the National History Day Contest outperform their non-participating peers and score higher on standardized tests, although this might be a reflection on the type of students who choose to participate in National History Day - those who seek to challenge themselves.

Impact on historians
Arnita Jones, executive director of the American Historical Association, wrote in 2001:
 Perhaps the greatest impact of National History Day...was on the historical profession itself. I truly believe that never have so many historians enjoyed engaging in the pursuit of history outside their offices, their regular classrooms, and their academic research as have the thousands who have participated in National History Day as teachers, mentors, consultants, and judges over more than two decades.

See also
Science Fair

Notes

Further reading

 Adams, David Wallace, and Marvin Pasch. "The past as experience: A qualitative assessment of National History Day." History Teacher (1987) 20#2: 179-194. in JSTOR
 Fehn, Bruce R.; Schul, James E. "Teaching and Learning Competent Historical Documentary Making: Lessons from National History Day Winners," History Teacher (2011) 45#1 pp 25–42. online
 Gorn, Cathy. "A Tribute to a Founding Father: David Van Tassel and National History Day," History Teacher (2001) 34#2 in JSTOR
 Page, Marilyn Louise. "National history day: An ethnohistorical case study." (Ph.D. dissertation, U of Massachusetts-Amherst, 1992). online
 Taber-Conover, Rebecca, "History Day in Connecticut," Connecticut History (2012) 51#2 pp 261–264

History organizations based in the United States
United States educational programs
History education
National Humanities Medal recipients
Historically themed events